Perry Murdock (1901–1988), was an American actor and set decorator. He acted in several films, particularly Westerns starring Bob Steele.

Filmography (as actor)
Captain Careless (1928) as Perry (and co-writer)
Lightning Speed (1928) as Shorty
The Amazing Vagabond (1929) as Haywire
Breezy Bill (1930) as Gabe's Son
Headin' North (1930) as "Snicker" Kimball
The Oklahoma Sheriff (1930) 
Western Justice (1934) as Rufe
Big Calibre (1935) as Deputy (and wrote the story)

Filmography (as screenwriter)
Tombstone Terror (1935)

References

1901 births
1988 deaths
American film actors
American set decorators